Jacek Kosmalski (born 4 September 1976) is a retired Polish football striker. He became top goalscorer on the second tier in 2006–07.

References

1976 births
Living people
Polish footballers
Legia Warsaw players
Kotwica Kołobrzeg footballers
Ząbkovia Ząbki players
KP Chemik Police players
Pogoń Szczecin players
ŁKS Łódź players
Polonia Warsaw players
Zawisza Bydgoszcz players
MKP Pogoń Siedlce players
Association football forwards